A Coppa dell’amicizia or friendship cup is a traditional Lombardic wooden cup, originating from mountainous Valle d'Aosta of Italy region and used for drinking specially prepared coffee drink in a good company of friends. This version of a friendship cup is transformed into an artistic object to decorate a household or is used as a gift for an acquaintance.

See also
 Noggin (cup)
 Fuddling cup
 Plastic cup
 Pythagorean cup
 Coffee cup
 Skull cup

References

Drinkware